Bigg Boss is an Indian Telugu-language television reality show of the Bigg Boss franchise which airs on Star Maa and streams on Disney+ Hotstar in India. It follows the format of the Dutch reality show Big Brother, which was first developed by Endemol in the Netherlands.

Starting in 2017, the show has rolled out five seasons so far; N. T. Rama Rao Jr. and Nani hosted Season 1 and 2 respectively, while Nagarjuna is hosting the show from Season 3 onwards. The Season 6 features general public along with celebrities as a housemates and was premiered on 4 September 2022 onwards.

Overview 
Bigg Boss is based on the Dutch series Big Brother format developed by John de Mol. A number of contestants known as "housemates" live in a purpose-built house and are isolated from the rest of the world. Each week, housemates nominate two of their fellow housemates for eviction, and the housemates who receive the most nominations would face a public vote. Eventually, one housemate would leave after being "evicted" from the House. In the final week, there were five housemates remaining, and the public voted for who they wanted to win. Unlike other versions of Big Brother, the Indian version uses celebrities as housemates, In season two, Bigg Boss team had selected three common people as contestants from the auditions.

Rules 
While all the rules have never been told to the audience, the most prominent ones are clearly seen. The housemates are not permitted to talk in any other language except Telugu.

They always have to wear a lapel and They cannot leave the House premises at any time unless they are evicted or decided by Bigg Boss. They can not discuss the nomination process with anyone. They are not allowed to sleep without the permission of Bigg Boss.

House 
The house for season one was set up at Lonavala. From season two onwards, the house was set up in Annapurna Studios, Hyderabad. The house is well-furnished and decorated. It has a variety of modern amenities, but just one or two bedrooms and four toilet bath rooms. There is a garden, pool, activity area and gym in the House. There is also a Confession Room, where the housemates may be called in by Bigg Boss for any kind of conversation, and for the nomination process. The jail was added from season two onwards in the house and in season three, courtyard part was added in the house. In season four newly special living area and lounge room were added by replacing activity and courtyard part in the house.

Broadcast 
Bigg Boss is aired on Star Maa and also  available on Disney+ Hotstar. Everyday episodes contain the main happenings of the previous day. Every Sunday episode mainly focuses on an interview of an evicted contestant by the host. The unseen episode will be available as Bigg Boss Buzzz on Star Maa Music and Disney+ Hotstar.

Series details

 Female Contestants
 Male Contestants

Notes

Housemate pattern

Bigg Boss Non-Stop 

The series is also set to roll out a digital version of the show called Bigg Boss Non-Stop, which is also going to be hosted by Nagarjuna and broadcast by Disney+ Hotstar for 24×7 coverage.

Reception

Season 1
Bigg Boss Telugu programme is regarded as the most expensive Telugu television show. The launch of season 1 opened with 16.18 TVR and became as the most watched Telugu television show.

Season 2
The launch of season 2 opened with 15.05 TVR.

Season 3
The launch of season 3 opened with 17.9 TVR, which is bigger than the previous seasons. The grand finale of season 3 of duration four and half hours scored 18.29 TVR being the highest ever rating achieved by the Bigg Boss Indian franchise. The last hour of telecast, featuring Chiranjeevi as chief guest, alone garnered 22.4 TVR.

Season 4
The launch of season 4 opened with 18.5 TVR higher than previous seasons. On Week 7, Samantha Akkineni hosted the show, while main host Nagarjuna is in Manali for his movie shooting and the episode was also extended to 3 hours, from the usual 1½ hours and the episode opened with 11.4 TVR, which was higher trp among all the weekends. The grand finale of season 4 became most watched and created a record with viewership as it garnered highest TRP rating of 19.51 TVR and in two states of Ap/Ts it received 21.7 TVR among all seasons of Bigg Boss editions.

Season 5 
The launch of fifth season has received about 17.7 TVR in general and 18 TVR with HD viewership and also, the latest rating proves that show’s popularity has remained intact. The grand finale episode had secured 18.4 TVR + millions of views on Disney+ Hotstar.

Season 6

Side shows

Bigg Boss Buzzz
Bigg Boss Buzzz is an Indian Telugu-language Television talk show with evicted housemates of reality television series Bigg Boss Telugu. From season 3 onwards, the show features evicted housemates interview with previous season contestant as a host on every Monday episode and also unseen portions of episodes that were not aired on television will be aired on Star Maa Music.

BB Cafe
BB Cafe is an review based show about the reality television series Bigg Boss Telugu. From season 6 onwards, The show features previous seasons contestants as host and will discusses all the topics of Bigg Boss Episodes. The show will continue to give more clarity on war, love and other interesting topics between the contestants and it premiers on Star Maa Music.

Related shows
Bigg Boss Mahotsavam
Bigg Battle: Kings vs Queens
Bigg Boss Intilo Maa Parivaar
BB Jodi Telugu

References

External links 
 Official Website

Bigg Boss (Telugu TV series)
Telugu-language television shows
Indian reality television series
2017 Indian television series debuts
Indian television series based on non-Indian television series
Star Maa original programming